Acrophobia is a free-fall tower ride located at Six Flags Over Georgia in Austell, Georgia. The attraction was designed by Intamin of Switzerland, and is marketed by Intamin's Liechtenstein-based subsidiary Ride Trade. When Acrophobia opened to the public on May 12, 2001, it became the first free-fall attraction of its kind in the world.

History
Acrophobia is the latest version in a long-running series of attractions designed by Intamin that create the sensation of free fall. The first free-fall towers were, in essence, vertical drop roller coaster rides, although many coaster fans do not classify them as such. One such example was Six Flags Over Georgia's own Free Fall, which was installed in the park in 1983 and removed in December 2006.

The Giant Drop variant improved upon the original free-fall tower in numerous ways, most noticeably in its braking system. Whereas the first-generation towers used standard friction brakes on a horizontal track section to slow down the descending cabins, the Giant Drop uses rare-earth magnets to gently slow the ride vehicle to a stop at the base of the tower. This innovation provided a fail-safe braking system—no electricity is required to create the magnetic forces—and also allowed for a smaller footprint.

The third-generation Gyro Drop tower kept the key innovations of the Giant Drop and added a new twist, literally. The ride's single round gondola would rotate during its ascent, providing a panoramic view of the surrounding countryside prior to the drop back to the ground.

Acrophobia was closed down on June 22, 2007, after an accident occurred on Superman: Tower of Power at Kentucky Kingdom when a 13-year-old girl had both of her feet severed by a faulty cable.

In March 2017, the park announced that the ride would receive a virtual reality experience called "Drop of Doom VR" that opened on the ride on March 11, 2017.

Attraction design & ride experience

Acrophobia is a significant modification to the Gyro Drop model, enough to be marketed as a distinct version, the "Floorless, Tilting Gyro Drop". Instead of being seated on the round ride gondola, riders are fastened into special harnesses that partially resemble large bicycle seats. These harnesses allow the riders' legs to dangle freely, similar to using a parachute; hence, no "floor."
As the ride cycle begins, a winch system grabs the gondola and lifts it upwards. Shortly after, the gondola begins to slowly rotate, completing one revolution before reaching the top of the tower. As it approaches the top of the tower, Acrophobia's second innovation is revealed—pneumatic pistons behind the harnesses tilt them outwards roughly 15 degrees past vertical. The intent is to "force" riders to look down and see how high they are. After a short delay, the winch releases the gondola, allowing it to free-fall back to the ground, where an array of braking systems slows it down and eventually allows it to come to a full stop, thus completing the cycle.
Acrophobia is just over 200 feet in height, as evidenced by the FAA-mandated red hazard beacon at the top of the tower, although the actual drop height of the ride is approximately 161 feet.
The ride cycle begins as the airgates open to allow the riders onto the ride and take their seats on the unit. Once all safety checks have been performed, attendants enter their chained safety zones and give the all clear signal. The Catcher comes down, winches the gondola and begins the ascent to the top of the tower. The 30 seat unit begins to rotate a full 360 degrees as it completes its revolution during the ascent. Once the catcher reaches the top of the tower, the operator teases and sometimes sings to the riders to encourage them to forget about the drop. After a few nerve-wracking seconds the gondola drops to the braking system in less than 3.5 seconds.

Safety systems
Riders are held in place by over the shoulder harnesses with safety belts.

The bulk of these features are concentrated at the base of the attraction; foremost among these is the tower's permanent magnet braking system. Using the principles of magnetism, these brakes slow down the falling gondola gently, yet rapidly, without actually contacting the gondola. These magnets do not require electricity to produce their magnetic fields, and as such they are able to function even in the event of a total power failure. Lastly, pneumatic plungers "catch" the slowly descending gondola and allow it to settle to the tower base. Like the magnetic brakes, these plungers do not require power to function properly. Acrophobia requires the rider to be at least 52 inches tall.

External links

Towers completed in 2001
Six Flags attractions
Drop tower rides
Amusement rides manufactured by Intamin
Six Flags Over Georgia
Amusement rides introduced in 2001